François Corteggiani (21 September 1953 – 21 September 2022) was a French comics artist and writer.

Biography
He was born on 21 September 1953 in France. He got a degree in art before becoming an artist for advertising. He created his first comic in 1974 for S.E.P.P. and Mucheroum for Spirou magazine. He illustrated works for various magazines and then, along with Michel Motti, he drew Pif le chien for Pif gadget. He also produced Disney comics for Le Journal de Mickey.

Taking over more work as scenarist, Corteggiani wrote for several series, among others succeeding Jean-Michel Charlier as writer for Young Blueberry. He died on his 69th birthday.

References

External links
 
 François Corteggiani biography on Lambiek Comiclopedia

1953 births
2022 deaths
Artists from Nice
French comics artists
French comics writers
French male writers
Disney comics writers
Disney comics artists